Milnesium berladnicorum is a species of Eutardigrade in the family Milnesiidae, native to Bârlad, Romania.  Brownish in color, the species grows to a length of 400 micrometers.  M. berladnicorum was named after the Berladnici, a tribe from Medieval Moldova.

References

 

Apochela
Invertebrates of Europe
Animals described in 2014